Jana Amin is an Egyptian-American activist known for advocating for girls' education and women's empowerment. She began her activism career by narrating the reality of Muslim women.

Background 
Jana moved to the United States at a young age. Her mother Rana el Kaliouby is a prominent computer scientist and entrepreneur. Jana has one younger brother.

Career 
Jana works closely with the Collateral Repair Project, an NGO which is based in Jordan supporting the rights of refugee girls and women. She taught English to refugee girls and women in Jordan soon after joining the Collateral Repair Project. She has also worked with Heya Masr, an NGO based in Egypt which runs awareness empowerment programmes for young women and which finances girls' education. She launched Bantota or Bantoota (a term for "girl" in Arabic) as an Instagram campaign for the rights of Muslim women, and also delivered a TedX-Youth Talk raising awareness on changing narratives about Muslim women. She has also hosted online virtual events including #17for17: Advocating for Girls' Education to raise awareness on the significance of girls' education.

She works as a research intern at the Middle East initiative at the Harvard Kennedy School. She also curated an exhibit entitled Princess Fawzia and the Duality of Egyptian Women at The American University in Cairo. She also wrote an editorial for the Malala Fund publication "Assembly", sharing the experiences she gained after attending Malala Yousafzai's lecture at Harvard University. In September 2020, she attended one of the high-profile events via online at the UN General Assembly's 75th annual session.

References 

Living people
Egyptian feminists
American feminists
Egyptian women's rights activists
American women's rights activists
Egyptian women activists
Harvard Kennedy School alumni
Egyptian expatriates in the United States
2003 births
21st-century American women